Sandiacre Town Football Club is a football club based in Sandiacre, England. 

Sandiacre Town Football Club was formed in 1978 by Malc Turton and Pete Smith and Tony Mattison. They had previously run the successful Ilkeston Town Under 14’s, and saw the need for youth football in Sandiacre.

At the very first practice night over 150 youngsters turned up and it was decided to run three teams in the Notts Youth League at under 16’s, 14’s & 12’s.
The first Trophy for the club was when the under 14 team won the 1978/79 Notts. Youth league beating Clifton all whites 5 2 to pipp them to the league title. The team was run by Tony Mattison and Peter Thornley
NG16 4FN 
Season 1979/80 saw the number of youth teams grow to five with a Saturday senior side also being established and joining the Central Alliance League as one of the founding members.

In 1982 work started on building the Club Headquarters at St. Giles Park, the cost of the project was £40,000 with half the money being raised by Club members. The building work was carried out with the help of the Manpower Services Commission and was completed in 1984, The official opening on 28 March 1984 was performed by Peter Taylor and Roy McFarland from Derby County Football Club.

The club today has 38 teams including junior up to senior. The first team play in the Nottinghamshire Senior League Premier Division,the Under 19s team play in the Notts Youth League and the Ladies in the Derbyshire Girls and Ladies League. At junior level the teams play in local leagues, such as The YEL.

History
The club played in the Central Alliance League in the 1970s and 1980s. They were one of the founding members of the Central Midlands League in 1983, but the club lost its place in the league in 1990 after failing ground grading. In 1992, the club merged with Lace Web United. They were promoted to the CML again after finishing runners-up in 1991–92.  They won the CML Premier Division in 1992–93. Their first appearance in the FA Vase was in 1995, and they reached the first round in 1997–98 and 2004–05.

Honours
Central Midlands League Premier Division
Champions 1992–93
Midlands Regional Alliance
Runners-up 1991–92

Records
FA Vase
First Round 1997–98, 2004–05

References

External links

Old website

Football clubs in England
Football clubs in Derbyshire
Midlands Regional Alliance
Central Midlands Football League
1970s establishments in England
Nottinghamshire Senior League